Plains is the 11th album of pianist George Winston and eighth solo piano album, released in 1999. It was his first studio album consisting of original compositions since 1994's Forest. According to Winston, "this album is inspired by the plains and its people. The four seasons there have always been my deepest source of inspiration."

The album was certified Gold by the RIAA on January 12, 2000. It was reissued in 2013 by Valley Entertainment with Dancing Cat Records. The reissue was packaged in a Digipak and features revised cover art.

Track listing

References

External links
 Liner notes

1999 albums
George Winston albums
Windham Hill Records albums